Rhinopteraspis is an extinct genus of pteraspidid heterostracan agnathan.

References

Pteraspidiformes genera
Devonian jawless fish
Early Devonian fish
Early Devonian fish of Europe